The 2020 Big South women's basketball tournament was the postseason women's basketball tournament that ended the 2019–20 season of the Big South Conference. It was scheduled be held from March 10 through March 15, 2020, at various campus sites. The winner would have received the conference's automatic bid to the NCAA tournament. On March 12, the NCAA announced that the tournament was cancelled due to the coronavirus pandemic.

Sites 
The first round will be played at campus sites at the home of the higher seed. The quarterfinals and semifinals will be played at #1 and #2 seeds. The championship game will be held at the home arena of the higher surviving seed.

Seeds
All 11 conference teams are eligible for the tournament. The top five teams will receive a first-round bye. Teams are seeded by record within the conference, with a tiebreaker system to seed teams with identical conference records.

Schedule

Bracket

See also
 2020 Big South Conference men's basketball tournament

References

Big South
Big South Conference women's basketball tournament
Big South Conference women's basketball tournament